Houmal is a town in Mount Lebanon which makes up one of the 70 towns and villages in the district of Aley. It is 400 meters above sea level and 25 kilometres from the capital Beirut.  It is both a Summer holiday location as well as being inhabited during the Winter months. It has proximity to the capital of Lebanon, Beirut.

History
In 1838, Eli Smith noted  the place, called Humal, located in El-Ghurb el-Fokany; Upper el-Ghurb.

Educational institutions
 Bdadoun Public School
Founded in 1921 by Selim Nouhra. It later became a public school.
 Ecole Saint Elie
Founded in 1941 by Elias Tannous who donated the land to Saint Famille Maronite nuns.

Geography
Houmal's bordering towns are Blaybel, Bdadoun, and Wadi Chahrour. Kahale and Kfarshima are close by.

References

Bibliography

External links
Houmal, localiban

Populated places in Mount Lebanon Governorate
Aley District